Andy Roddick was the defending champion, and won in the final 6–0, 6–4, against Cyril Saulnier.

Seeds

Main draw

Finals

Top half

Bottom half

External links
Main draw
Qualifying draw

2005 ATP Tour